Jacopo Bacci (born 19 June 2005) is an Italian professional footballer who plays for Calcio Padova.

Club career 
Having played the 2021–22 season in the Primavera squad, Jacopo Bacci made his professional debut for Calcio Padova on the 24 April 2022 along with his under-19 captain Jacopo Gasparini, replacing Ronaldo during a 2–1 home Serie C loss to Virtus Verona.

He subsequently became a stable member of the professional group, with whom he left for the subsequent training session in France, with RC Lens.

References

External links

2004 births
Living people
Italian footballers
Italy youth international footballers
Association football midfielders
Sportspeople from Padua
Calcio Padova players
Serie C players